Matteo Flasaperla (Roma, 5 May 1990) is an Italian rugby union player.
His usual position is as a Fullback and he played for Mogliano in Top10 in 2021−22 season.

From 2019 to 2021, he played for Valorugby Emilia in Top12.

From 2013 to 2018 Falsaperla was part of the Italy Sevens squad.

References 

It's Rugby Englan Profile
ESPN Profile
Eurosport Profile

Sportspeople from Rome
Italian rugby union players
1990 births
Living people
Rugby union fullbacks